The Grove Hospital, originally the Grove Fever Hospital, was a hospital for infectious diseases opened in Tooting Grove, London.

History
The hospital was opened as the Grove Fever Hospital in Tooting Grove, London in 1899. It became the Grove Military Hospital in 1916 before reverting to civilian use as a fever hospital again in 1920. In 1932, Joseph Bramhall Ellison, while working at the hospital, discovered that vitamin A significantly reduces measles mortality in children. It joined the National Health Service as the Grove Hospital in 1948. It became St George's Hospital, Tooting Branch in 1958 and, although two ward blocks remain, most of the premises were demolished in 1973.

Notable staff 

 Alice Ann Browne R.R.C.(1866-  ) Matron, 1902 - until at least 1925, also Matron of The Grove Military Hospital 1916-1919. Browne trained at The London Hospital under Eva Luckes between 1895-1897 and had worked at St Pancras Infirmary as Night Sister and Matron at the Union Infirmary, Newcastle upon Tyne before this appointment. Whilst she was matron of the Fever Hospital Browne was responsible for 537 patients. As a military hospital  it enlarged to 1,000 beds.

References

External links 
St George's Hospital

Defunct hospitals in London
1899 establishments in England
Fever hospitals